Red Army Football Club, is a South Sudanese sporting club cored in Aweil, South Sudan; it plays in South Sudan Premier League (SSPL).

History
Since Red Army came to being on December 15, 2013, it first faced the toughest games which promoted it to the second division initially, but as of 2016; it consolidated its strength that promoted it to the first division. Its president is Jacob Garang who is also the founder of Red Army.

As of 2016, on November 1, Red Army was knocked out by military club in penalties 4–3.

Other websites 
 Redarmy.com

References

Football clubs in South Sudan
Military association football clubs